Aberdeen North may refer to:
 Aberdeen North (UK Parliament constituency)
 Aberdeen North (Scottish Parliament constituency)